Petrus Petri Torpensis Sudermannus (1611–1679) was a Swedish prelate, vicar in the Diocese of Västerås, writer, and poet. He was attached to the Royal Academy of Åbo.

He married Bellina, daughter of Stephanus Olai Bellinus, and granddaughter of Olaus Canuti Helsingius.

Bibliography
 De prima et cardinali virtute Justitia. Ab. 1643
 De adjunctorum propriorum communicatione. Ib. 1646
 Pentas I. Quæstionum nobiliorum Philosophicarum. Ib. 1648
 Pentas II. Quæstion. selectiorum Philosophicarum, e. a.
 Pentas III. Quæst. præstantiorum Philos. Ib. e. a.
 Pentas I, II, III et IV. Quæstionum selectior. philos. Aros. 1659, 1660 ("4 Gymnasiidisputationer")
 Historia universalis

References
 Professorer och studenter. Berättelse från Åbo på 1660-talet (1888) av Rafael Hertzberg: https://gupea.ub.gu.se/bitstream/2077/53417/1/gupea_2077_53417_1.pdf
 Westerås Stifts Herdaminne av Johan Fredrik Muncktell, första delen: https://www.zenker.se/Historia/Herdaminne/odensvi.shtml#kh10
 Bidrag till Kännedom af Finlands Natur och Folk, utgifna af Finska Vetenskaps-Societeten, Femte Häftet: http://runeberg.org/bkfnf/5/0091.html
 Latin Dissertations and Disputations in the Early Modern Swedish Gymnasium – A Study of a Latin School Tradition c. 1620 – c. 1820, Axel Hörstedt: https://gupea.ub.gu.se/bitstream/2077/55897/1/gupea_2077_55897_1.pdf
 Östgötars minne; biografiska anteckningar om studerande Östgötar i Uppsala 1595–1900: https://archive.org/stream/stgtarsminnebio00odgoog/stgtarsminnebio00odgoog_djvu.txt

1611 births
1679 deaths
17th-century Swedish Lutheran priests
17th-century Swedish poets
Swedish male poets
Writers from Södermanland
Swedish male writers